Scobinancistrus aureatus is a species of catfish in the family Loricariidae. It is native to South America, where it occurs in the Xingu River basin in Brazil. The species reaches 29 cm (11.4 inches) in total length.

S. aureatus appears in the aquarium trade, where it is typically referred to either as the sunshine pleco, as the goldie pleco, or by its associated L-number, which is L-014.

References 

Loricariidae